Codyville is an unorganized territory (township) in Washington County, Maine, United States. The population was 13 at the 2020 census.

Codyville was formerly a plantation, but it disorganized in 2019.

History
Codyville was named after its first settler and was organized as a plantation in 1872. After sustaining a steady population decline since the 1930s, the plantation ultimately disorganized in 2019.

Geography

Demographics

As of the census of 2000, there were 19 people, 9 households, and 6 families residing in the plantation. The population density was 0.3 people per square mile (0.1/km2). There were 25 housing units at an average density of 0.5 per square mile (0.2/km2). The racial makeup of the plantation was 100.00% White.

There were 9 households, out of which 11.1% had children under the age of 18 living with them, 66.7% were married couples living together, and 33.3% were non-families. 33.3% of all households were made up of individuals, and 33.3% had someone living alone who was 65 years of age or older. The average household size was 2.11 and the average family size was 2.67.

In the plantation the population was spread out, with 5.3% under the age of 18, 10.5% from 18 to 24, 21.1% from 25 to 44, 47.4% from 45 to 64, and 15.8% who were 65 years of age or older. The median age was 50 years. For every 100 females, there were 90.0 males. For every 100 females age 18 and over, there were 100.0 males.

The median income for a household in the plantation was $68,750, and the median income for a family was $85,139. Males had a median income of $55,417 versus $21,250 for females. The per capita income for the plantation was $21,295. None of the population and none of the families were below the poverty line.

References

External links
Contact Information for Codyville Plantation, Maine

Unorganized territories in Maine